The Spruce Grove Saints are a junior A ice hockey team in the Alberta Junior Hockey League (AJHL). They play in Spruce Grove, Alberta, Canada, with home games at Grant Fuhr Arena.

History
The Saints' franchise is the only franchise remaining from the inception of the Alberta Junior Hockey League (AJHL). The franchise began as the Edmonton Movers in 1963 before it merged with the Edmonton Maple Leafs organization to become the Edmonton Mets for the 1972–73 season. It then relocated to Spruce Grove as the Spruce Grove Mets for the 1974–75 season. During its first stint in Spruce Grove, the Mets won the 1975 Centennial Cup as Canadian Jr. A national champions and two league championships. After three years in Spruce Grove, the franchise relocated again to nearby St. Albert to become the St. Albert Saints in 1977. The franchise captured four AJHL championships during its time in St. Albert.

After 27 years in St. Albert, arena issues caused the franchise to return to Spruce Grove as the Spruce Grove Saints in 2004. Since returning to Spruce Grove, the team has won five AJHL playoff championships and five regular season titles, but have not advanced to the National Junior A Championship after failing to advance past the Doyle Cup or Western Canada Cup qualifiers.

Over 50 former Saints' players have gone on to play in the National Hockey League, including Mark Messier, Stu Barnes, Mike Comrie, and Steven Reinprecht.

Season-by-season record
Note: GP = Games played, W = Wins, L = Losses, T/OTL = Ties/Overtime losses, Pts = Points, GF = Goals for, GA = Goals against

Western Canada Cup
The Western Canada Cup was a postseason tournament between the playoff champions of the Alberta Junior Hockey League (AJHL), British Columbia Hockey League (BCHL), Manitoba Junior Hockey League (MJHL), Saskatchewan Junior Hockey League (SJHL), and a previously selected host team from one of the leagues. It ran from 2013 to 2017 with the top two teams qualifying for the Royal Bank Cup Junior A national championship tournament. It replaced the Doyle Cup, which had been the qualifier for the AJHL and BCHL champions, and the ANAVET Cup, which had been the qualifier for the MJHL and SJHL champions. The qualifying system reverted the Doyle and ANAVET Cups in 2018.

The tournament began with round-robin play between the five team followed by the top two teams playing in championship game and the third and fourth place teams playing in a semifinal game. The loser of the championship game then faced the winner of the semifinal game for the runner-up qualifier. The winner of the championship and the runner-up game advanced to the Royal Bank Cup.

See also
 List of ice hockey teams in Alberta

External links
Spruce Grove Saints website
Alberta Junior Hockey League website

Alberta Junior Hockey League teams
Ice hockey teams in Alberta
Ice hockey clubs established in 2004
Spruce Grove